ISO 3166-2:LB is the entry for Lebanon in ISO 3166-2, part of the ISO 3166 standard published by the International Organization for Standardization (ISO), which defines codes for the names of the principal subdivisions (e.g., provinces or states) of all countries coded in ISO 3166-1.

Currently for Lebanon, ISO 3166-2 codes are defined for eight governorates. Aakkâr Governorate (which contains the current Aakkâr District) and Baalbek-Hermel Governorate (which contains the current Baalbek District and Hermel District), which are listed, are in the process of being implemented after having been approved for creation in 2003.

Each code consists of two parts, separated by a hyphen. The second part is two letters.

Current codes
Subdivision names are listed as in the ISO 3166-2 standard published by the ISO 3166 Maintenance Agency (ISO 3166/MA).

Click on the button in the header to sort each column.

Changes
The following changes to the entry have been announced in newsletters by the ISO 3166/MA since the first publication of ISO 3166-2 in 1998:

See also
 Subdivisions of Lebanon
 FIPS region codes of Lebanon

External links
 ISO Online Browsing Platform: LB
 Provinces of Lebanon, Statoids.com

2:LB
ISO 3166-2
Lebanon geography-related lists